Norway participated in the Eurovision Song Contest 2015 with the song "A Monster Like Me", written by Kjetil Mørland. The song was performed by Mørland and Debrah Scarlett. Norwegian broadcaster Norsk rikskringkasting (NRK) organised the national final Melodi Grand Prix 2015 in order to select the Norwegian entry for the 2015 contest in Vienna, Austria. After two rounds of public televoting, "A Monster Like Me" performed by Mørland and Debrah Scarlett emerged as the winners. In the second of the Eurovision semi-finals "A Monster Like Me" placed fourth out of the 17 participating countries, securing its place among the 27 other songs in the final. In Norway's fifty-fourth Eurovision appearance on 23 May, "A Monster Like Me" finished in eighth place, receiving 102 points.

Background 

Prior to the 2015 contest, Norway had participated in the Eurovision Song Contest fifty-three times since its first entry in 1960. Norway had won the contest on three occasions: in 1985 with the song "La det swinge" performed by Bobbysocks!, in 1995 with the song "Nocturne" performed by Secret Garden, and in 2009 with the song "Fairytale" performed by Alexander Rybak. Norway also has the two dubious distinctions of having finished last in the Eurovision final more than any other country and for having the most "nul points" (zero points) in the contest. The country has finished last eleven times and has failed to score a point during four contests. Since the introduction of semi-finals to the format of the contest in 2004, Norway has, to this point, finished in the top ten five times. Wig Wam finished ninth with the song "In My Dreams" in 2005, Maria Haukaas Storeng was fifth in 2008 with "Hold On Be Strong", Alexander Rybak won in 2009, Margaret Berger was fourth in 2013 with "I Feed You My Love", and Carl Espen finished eighth in 2014 performing "Silent Storm".

The Norwegian broadcaster for the 2015 contest, who broadcast the event in Norway and organised the selection process for its entry, was Norsk rikskringkasting (NRK). The broadcaster confirmed that Norway would participate in the 2015 Eurovision Song Contest on 21 May 2014. On 5 June 2014, the broadcaster revealed details regarding their selection procedure and announced the organization of the national final Melodi Grand Prix 2015.

Before Eurovision

Melodi Grand Prix 2015 
Melodi Grand Prix 2015 was the 53rd edition of the Norwegian national final Melodi Grand Prix and selected Norway's entry for the Eurovision Song Contest 2015. The show took place on 14 March 2015 at the Oslo Spektrum in Oslo, hosted by Silya Nymoen and Kåre Magnus Bergh. For the first time since 1998, NRK reinstated a live orchestra as part of the show. The 54 members of the Norwegian Radio Orchestra accompanied each performance in varying capacities. The show was televised on NRK1 as well as streamed online at NRK's official website nrk.no and the official Eurovision Song Contest website eurovision.tv. The national final was watched by 1.25 million viewers in Norway, 500,000 more than the viewing figures for 2014.

Competing entries 
A submission period was opened by NRK between 5 June 2014 and 1 September 2014. Songwriters of any nationality were allowed to submit entries. In addition to the public call for submissions, NRK reserved the right to directly invite certain artists and composers to compete. At the close of the deadline, 800 submissions were received – a 30% increase over the previous year. Eleven songs were selected for the competition by a jury panel consisting of Vivi Stenberg (Melodi Grand Prix music producer), Marie Komissar (radio host and music producer), Tarjei Strøm (musician and radio host) and Kathrine Synnes Finnskog (director of Music Norway). The competing acts and songs were revealed on 21 January 2015 during a press conference at NRK studios, presented by Kåre Magnus Bergh and broadcast via NRK1 and online at mgp.no. Among the competing artists were former Eurovision Song Contest entrants Tor Endresen, who represented Norway in 1997 and Elisabeth Andreassen (Bettan), who represented Sweden in 1982 and Norway in 1985 (as part of Bobbysocks!), 1994 (alongside Jan Werner Danielsen) and 1996. 15-second clips of the competing entries were released during the press conference, while the songs in their entirety were premiered on 17 February.

Final 
Eleven songs competed during the final on 14 March 2015. Six of the songs were performed together with the Norwegian Radio Orchestra. The winner was selected over two rounds of public televoting. In the first round, the top four entries were selected to proceed to the second round, the Gold Final. In the Gold Final, the results of the public televote were revealed by Norway's five regions and led to the victory of "A Monster Like Me" performed by Mørland and Debrah Scarlett with 88,869 votes.

At Eurovision 

According to Eurovision rules, all nations with the exceptions of the host country and the "Big Five" (France, Germany, Italy, Spain and the United Kingdom) are required to qualify from one of two semi-finals in order to compete for the final; the top ten countries from each semi-final progress to the final. In the 2015 contest, Australia also competed directly in the final as an invited guest nation. The European Broadcasting Union (EBU) split up the competing countries into five different pots based on voting patterns from previous contests, with countries with favourable voting histories put into the same pot. On 26 January 2015, a special allocation draw was held which placed each country into one of the two semi-finals, as well as which half of the show they would perform in. Norway was placed into the second semi-final, to be held on 21 May 2015, and was scheduled to perform in the first half of the show.

Once all the competing songs for the 2015 contest had been released, the running order for the semi-finals was decided by the shows' producers rather than through another draw, so that similar songs were not placed next to each other. Norway was set to perform in position 6, following the entry from Malta and before the entry from Portugal.

All three shows were televised on NRK1, with commentary by Olav Viksmo-Slettan. The Norwegian broadcaster also broadcast the three shows with sign language performers for the hearing impaired on NRK1 Tegnspråk. The final was broadcast via radio on NRK P1 with commentary by Per Sundnes. An alternative broadcast of the final was also televised on NRK3 with commentary by the hosts of the NRK P3 radio show P3morgen Ronny Brede Aase, Silje Reiten Nordnes and Markus Ekrem Neby. The Norwegian spokesperson, who announced the Norwegian votes during the final, was Margrethe Røed.

Semi-final

Mørland and Debrah Scarlett took part in technical rehearsals on 13 and 16 May, followed by dress rehearsals on 20 and 21 May. This included the jury final where professional juries of each country, responsible for 50 percent of each country's vote, watched and voted on the competing entries.

The stage show featured the duo in costumes designed by Elisabeth Stray Pedersen: Mørland appeared in a white and black suit and Debrah Scarlett appeared in a white crop top and skirt with an ornate silver hair clip. The performance was simplistic and was largely captured using one camera. The stage atmosphere was dark for the beginning of the song with bronze and orange lighting intensifying as the song progressed. The performance choreographer, Mattias Carlsson, stated: "all the focus should be on the song and the artists, so we don't think we need any graphics". While Mørland and Debrah Scarlett appeared on stage alone, they were joined by four backing vocalists: Julie Lillehaug Kaasa, May Kristin Kaspersen, Håvard Gryting and Bjørnar Reime.

At the end of the show, Norway was announced as having finished in the top ten and subsequently qualifying for the grand final. It was later revealed that the Norway placed fourth in the semi-final, receiving a total of 123 points.

Final
Shortly after the second semi-final, a winner's press conference was held for the ten qualifying countries. As part of this press conference, the qualifying artists took part in a draw to determine which half of the grand final they would subsequently participate in. This draw was done in the order the countries were announced during the semi-final. Norway was drawn to compete in the first half. Following this draw, the shows' producers decided upon the running order of the final, as they had done for the semi-finals. Norway was subsequently placed to perform in position 9, following the entry from Serbia and before the entry from Sweden.

Mørland and Debrah Scarlett once again took part in dress rehearsals on 22 and 23 May before the final, including the jury final where the professional juries cast their final votes before the live show. The duet performed a repeat of their semi-final performance during the final on 23 May. At the conclusion of the voting, Norway placed eighth with 102 points.

Marcel Bezençon Awards
The Marcel Bezençon Awards, first awarded during the 2002 contest, are awards honouring the best competing songs in the final each year. Named after the creator of the annual contest, Marcel Bezençon, the awards are divided into three categories: the Press Award, given to the best entry as voted on by the accredited media and press during the event; the Artistic Award, presented to the best artist as voted on by the shows' commentators; and the Composer Award, given to the best and most original composition as voted by the participating composers. "A Monster Like Me" was awarded the Composer Award, which was accepted at the awards ceremony by the song's composer Kjetil Mørland.

Voting
Voting during the three shows consisted of 50 percent public televoting and 50 percent from a jury deliberation. The jury consisted of five music industry professionals who were citizens of the country they represent, with their names published before the contest to ensure transparency. This jury was asked to judge each contestant based on: vocal capacity; the stage performance; the song's composition and originality; and the overall impression by the act. In addition, no member of a national jury could be related in any way to any of the competing acts in such a way that they cannot vote impartially and independently. The individual rankings of each jury member were released shortly after the grand final.

Following the release of the full split voting by the EBU after the conclusion of the competition, it was revealed that Norway had placed seventeenth with the public televote and seventh with the jury vote in the final. In the public vote, Norway scored 43 points, while with the jury vote, Norway scored 163 points. In the second semi-final, Norway placed fifth with the public televote with 104 points and third with the jury vote, scoring 144 points.

Below is a breakdown of points awarded to Norway and awarded by Norway in the second semi-final and grand final of the contest, and the breakdown of the jury voting and televoting conducted during the two shows:

Points awarded to Norway

Points awarded by Norway

Detailed voting results
The following members comprised the Norwegian jury:
 Alexander Stenerud (jury chairperson)singer-songwriter
 Anita Wisløffbooking agent
 Marianne Jemtegårdeditor
 Margaret Bergersinger, represented Norway in the 2013 contest
 Sverre Vedaleditor

References

External links 
Official NRK Eurovision site
Full national final on nrk.no

2015
Countries in the Eurovision Song Contest 2015
2015
Eurovision
Eurovision